Extinction (formerly known as Welcome to Harmony) is a 2015 post-apocalyptic horror film directed by Miguel Ángel Vivas who also co-wrote the screenplay with Alberto Marini from the novel Y pese a todo by Juan de Dios Garduño. The film stars Matthew Fox, Jeffrey Donovan and Quinn McColgan. In a post-apocalypse future, three survivors confront issues from their past, as well as a race of crazed zombies. The film was released on July 31, 2015 in the United States. It is a joint-production between Spain, Hungary and France.

Plot
After a virus turns people into zombies, a small group of survivors seek refuge in a snow-covered town, believing the virus and all of its monstrous creations had died out. But they only discover the infected had adapted to the environment change, for worse.

The story starts out with survivors on two buses trying to make it to a safe zone. The first bus is attacked by the infected. The people in the second bus, including the main characters (Jack, Patrick, Emma and baby Lu) try to escape. While hiding, Emma is attacked by an infected and bitten.

9 years later, Jack and Patrick are living separately in houses next door, divided by a fence. Emma has died and Lu, now 9, is living with Jack, who she calls father. It is revealed that Patrick is her biological father. She was taken away by Jack because Patrick became an alcoholic and when Emma was attacked and killed, Patrick didn't save her. Now, Patrick and Jack do not talk to each other, and Lu is forbidden to leave the premises. However, she bonds with Patrick's dog between the fence.

A few days later, Patrick and his dog come across a half eaten fox. He follows the trail and sees an infected. He tries to get away but hits a fallen tree. The infected looks down on him but doesn't see him. Instead its ears start moving and it is attracted to gun shots coming from Jack's home. Patrick heads home, firing off shots to warn Jack. However, he attracts the infected and it attacks him. He is bitten on the neck but his dog saves him when Jack hesitates to shoot.

Lu is angry that Jack didn't do anything to help. That night Lu sneaks out of the house to put flowers on the dog's grave. She is attacked by the infected but Jack gets to her in time. He is severely injured by the zombie. Patrick saves Jack and Lu, and ties up the infected. They learn that even though they were technically infected, they are immune to the disease because none of them turned. They also learn that the infected have evolved: they can't see but they have enhanced hearing.

The next day, Lu wants to invite Patrick over for dinner and Jack agrees. Patrick talks on the radio and someone responds, prompting Patrick to want to leave. Jack asks if they can join him and he agrees. They go to the warehouse to pick up supplies and Lu sees a woman in the distance. The guys take her home, realizing she is pregnant. She tells them that her group had heard Patrick on the radio and were on their way. However, their convoy got attacked. At this moment she hears the howling of an infected they had caught. She shoots it with Patrick's gun and tells them the howling is how they call each other.

They start to board up the house when they hear howling in the distance. Many infected come to the house and start to attack. Fighting ensues; the woman plays music loudly, causing the infected to stop attacking and cover their ears. But the generator starts to run out of gas, causing the music to turn down. Patrick makes a decision to sacrifice himself by luring the infected away from the house. Lighting a flare, he hollers to the infected and they follow. Jack, Lu and the woman drive away as Patrick blows up himself and the infected. Jack, Lu and the woman leave town and watch the sunrise.

Cast
 Matthew Fox as Patrick
 Jeffrey Donovan as Jack
 Quinn McColgan as Lu
 Valeria Vereau as Emma
 Alex Hafner as Lewinsky
 Clara Lago as Anne

Production
The film was first announced on December 20, 2013 as an Ombra Films production, with Jaume Collet-Sera and Miguel Ángel Vivas as producers. Filming began in Budapest and the first images were released on February 21, 2014.

Reception
On Rotten Tomatoes, the film has a 20% rating, with an average score of 5.1/10, based on ten critics. Metacritic gives the film a 46 out of 100, sampled from four critics, indicating "mixed or average reviews".

In the New York Daily News review of "Extinction" by Katherine Pushkar entitled "Zombies on Ice" the critic commented on the relationship between Jack and Patrick: "...The movie spends nearly an hour - too long - establishing the bad blood". Considering the zombies, Pushkar noted: "The zombies have evolved. They can now survive cold but they no longer infect people via flesh wounds. Also, they are blind. These are only problems if you're a zombie purist. At least they still want to tear people apart, and they remain plenty scary. If only they had more screen time". Pushkar concluded: "The films core problems: too little zombie and too much plot. The upside though is McColgan as Lu...clearly someone to watch".

Frank Scheck in "The Extinction Review" for The Hollywood Reporter argued: "If there's one reason to hope for an actual zombie apocalypse, it's that there will at least be no more zombie apocalypse movies."

In his "Extinction Review" for Fangoria, Michael Gingold commented: "As movies about flesh-hungry ghouls have overwhelmed the horror scene...it's refreshing when the occasional film puts the people at a premium. Such a movie is Extinction." He added: "...Vivas wrangles the drama into a quietly gripping survival saga, he and his leads fleshing out the trio of protagonists to empathetic effect." He praised "Pedro De Gaspar and Miguel Riesco's detailed production design" and a final act "...packed with exciting, impactful action". He considered that "Extinction...[is] a zombie movie whose creators have recognized that the subgenre's tropes have been played out, and aimed for something a little different."

See also 
 List of Spanish films of 2015

References

External links
 
 

Spanish horror films
French horror films
American zombie films
Hungarian horror films
English-language French films
English-language Hungarian films
English-language Spanish films
2015 horror films
Films shot in Budapest
Films about viral outbreaks
2010s English-language films
Films directed by Miguel Ángel Vivas
2010s American films
2010s Spanish films
2010s French films
Post-apocalyptic films